Corre is a commune in the Haute-Saône department of France.

Corre may also refer to:

People
 Corre (surname)

Music
"¡Corre!", by Jesse & Joy
"Corre", by Bebe from ''Pafuera Telarañas', 2004

See also
 Corre La Licorne, French car maker founded in 1901
 The Corre, a former professional wrestling stable in WWE